Roger Lance Mobley (born January 16, 1949) is  a former child actor in the 1950s and 1960s who made more than 118 television appearances and co-starred in nine feature films in a nine-year career. He served in the Green Berets (46th Special Forces Company) during the Vietnam War, and was subsequently a police officer in Beaumont, Texas.

Background
Mobley is one of eight children of Arthur Lance Mobley and Charlene V. Mobley. Lance Mobley, as the father was known, was born in Centralia in southern Illinois, and a retired pipefitter at the time of his death in a hospital in Beaumont, Texas.  Charlene and he married in 1939, when he was 17, and she was 15. The couple moved from Indiana in the early 1950s to Pecos in Reeves County in West Texas before they headed in 1957 to Whittier, near Los Angeles.

Acting

Mobley (pronounced "Mahbley") sang with his older brother and sister in The Little Mobley Trio in Texas where the family then lived.  After moving to California when Mobley was six or seven, the trio appeared on the Ted Mack's Original Amateur Hour with disappointing results.

They were spotted, though, by Lola Moore, then the pre-eminent agent for child actors, who expressed an interest in Roger and arranged his audition for the part of eight-year-old  Homer "Packy" Lambert in the NBC Saturday-morning Western television series, Fury, starring Peter Graves, Bobby Diamond, and William Fawcett. He appeared in 38 episodes of the series.

In 1964, after having been impressed with Mobley's performance as Gustav in Emil and the Detectives, Walt Disney signed him to the title role in the highly acclaimed and Emmy-nominated "Adventures of Gallegher" serials for the Wonderful World of Color. Gallegher is an amateur sleuth newspaper reporter, a character created by author Richard Harding Davis. Contrary to popular rumor, it was Mobley's name written by Walt Disney in his last memo before his death.

After 9 years and appearances in 118 television programs or feature films, Mobley's career was interrupted at the age of 18 by military service. Mobley eventually graduated Parachute Jump School (Fort Benning, Georgia) and JFK Special Warfare School (Fort Bragg, North Carolina) and was assigned to the 6th Special Group (Fort Bragg) and the 46th Special Special Forces Co., 1st Special Forces (1969-1970), before being honorably discharged in 1970.
Upon his return home to Whittier, Mobley found that only $6,000 earnings from his extensive film work as a child had been saved for him. His new bride and he moved to Texas, where he landed a position on the Beaumont, Texas Police Dept.

As of 2022, his marriage to his high school sweetheart is still intact after 54 years, and they have three children, 12 grandchildren, and one great grandchild. Mobley and his wife are members of the Lutheran Church Missouri Synod.

Filmography

References

Further reading 

 Holmstrom, John (1996). The Moving Picture Boy: An International Encyclopaedia from 1895 to 1995. Norwich: Michael Russell, p. 288-289.

External links
Roger Mobley Official Website
 

1949 births
Living people
High school football players in the United States
American male child actors
Male Western (genre) film actors
American male television actors
United States Army soldiers
Actors from Evansville, Indiana
People from Pecos, Texas
People from Greater Los Angeles
People from Beaumont, Texas
People from Newton County, Texas
People from Jasper County, Texas
Male actors from Little Rock, Arkansas
American police officers
American Lutherans
People from Vidor, Texas
Members of the United States Army Special Forces
Indiana Republicans
Texas Republicans
California Republicans
Arkansas Republicans